Ghee rice is cooked rice where spices are added to give a distinct flavour with ghee being the primary ingredient. Spiced rice is common among the people of Kerala, especially Malabar region of Kerala, Tulunad region of Karnataka and in Tamil Nadu. It is seen in other parts of India and Asia too in some variation. It is called 'neyita nuppu' in Tulunad region (Udupi-Mangalore) and 'neyichoru' in Tamil and Malayalam.

Varieties of spiced rice
Pulav or biryani
Chitranna, rice sautéed with ground nuts, turmeric, oil, mustard seeds and dry chilli.
Bisi bele bath, rice sautéed with vegetables and chilli powder.
Ghee rice, rice sautéed in ghee along with chilli, mustard seeds.
Jeera rice, rice sautéed with ghee or oil along with cumin seeds.

References

Indian rice dishes
Pakistani rice dishes
Kerala cuisine